Tour Generación RBD en Vivo (English: RBD Generation Tour Live) is the first live album released by Mexican pop band RBD. The album was recorded live at a concert from the band's Tour Generación RBD in Mexico City's Palacio de los Deportes. It features songs from their debut album Rebelde, one new live track, two medleys of popular songs in the album's Mexican edition, and on the edition released in the US, a track that later appeared on their second studio album, Nuestro Amor.

The album was certified platinum (Latin) in the United States (for over 100,000 copies sold) in February 2006. The album mirrored this success in Brazil, where it reached the number one position, spending several weeks at the top of the charts.

The album was released in Spain on September 11, 2006. A DVD of the tour was also released, which was titled Tour Generación RBD En Vivo as well.

Background and release 
On July 19, 2005 the standard edition of the album was released in the United States.  The live album was recorded on May 27, 2005 during RBD's concert in the Palacio de los Deportes in Mexico City, as part of their Tour Generación RBD, which visited over 30 Mexican cities, in addition to Venezuela, Colombia, Puerto Rico and Ecuador.

On March 2, 2006 a 'Diamond Edition' of the album was also released, which included tracks in Portuguese, games, a documentary and photos of the band.

Commercial performance 
The album was a commercial success in both Mexico and the United States. The album reached number one on the Mexican Albums Chart and was certified platinum + gold for sales of 150,000 copies. In the United States, the album reached  29 on the Billboard Top Heatseekers Albums chart, managing to stay on the chart for eight weeks. On the Billboard Top Latin Albums chart, it reached No. 22 and remained there for 33 weeks, while on Billboard Latin Pop Albums it peaked at No. 6 and spent 28 weeks on the chart. The RIAA certified the album platinum (Latin) for sales of 100,000 copies.

The album also had a favorable reception in Spain. The album peaked at No. 13 on the Spanish Albums Chart, where it ranked for 18 weeks. PROMUSICAE certified the album gold for sales of 40,000 copies in Spain. It was also well received in Brazil, where the album charted at No. 16 on the Brazilian Albums Chart.

Track listing 

The songs "Santa No Soy" and "Cuando El Amor Se Acaba" (Maite's first solo) were a part of the tour set list but were not included on either edition of the album.

The song, "Liso, Sensual" was later featured on their second album, Nuestro Amor.

Edición Diamante 

Note
Apart from the enhanced content, the 'Edición Diamante' followed the same track list as the Mexican edition of the standard album, except "Liso, Sensual" was added as the last track.

Personnel 
Credits adapted from the album's liner notes.

Mastered at
 Cosmos Mastering, Mexico

Vocals
RBD – all vocals

Musicians
Güido Laris – guitars, bass guitar
Mauricio Soto Lartigue – drums

Production

Camilo Lara – A&R
Melissa Mochulske – A&R coordination
Güido Laris –  arrangements
 Pedro Damián – executive producer
Carlos Lara – executive producer
Luis Luisillo Miguel – associate producer
Emilio Ávila – executive producer (concert)
Hula Hula – graphic design, additional photography
Armando Ávila –  mixer, producer
Marisol Alcelay –  product manager, marketing
Carolina Palomo Ramos –  production coordinator
Andrew Rose –  recording assistant
Juan Carlos Moguel –  additional recording
Ricardo Trabulsi –  photographer
Gabriel Alarcón –  additional photography
Víctor Deschamps –  additional photography

Accolades

Chart positions

Certifications

Release history

See also 
Tour Generación RBD En Vivo (DVD)

Notes

References 

RBD live albums
2005 live albums
Albums recorded at the Palacio de los Deportes